Productus subaculeatus is an extinct species of brachiopods. Its fossils are present in the Devonian.

References

Devonian brachiopods
Late Devonian animals
Productida
Paleozoic brachiopods of Europe